Jesse Mustonen (24 November 1995) is a Finnish motorcycle speedway rider.

Career
Mustonen started his career mainly as a longtrack rider and he reached the final of the 2014 Team Long Track World Championship, where Finland finished fourth just outside the medal placings. He continued to represent Finland and won a bronze medal the following year at the 2015 Team Long Track World Championship and despite top scoring for Finland in 2016 and 2017 they were placed outside the medals.

In the Individual Speedway Long Track World Championship he reached the final five years running from 2016 to 2020 and managed a best place finish of 8th.

He represented Finland at the 2019 Speedway of Nations and again at the 2022 Speedway of Nations. Also in 2022, he became the national champion of Finland after winning the Finnish Individual Speedway Championship.

See also 
 Finland national speedway team

References 

Living people
1995 births
Finnish speedway riders